Lata (Hindi: लता) is a Hindu/Sanskrit Indian female given name, which means "creeper" and "vine". Lata may refer to:

Notable people named Lata
Lata Bhatt (born 1954), Indian singer.
Lata (born 1975), Musician.
Lata Mangeshkar (1929–2022), Indian singer.
Lata Mondal (born 1993), Bangladeshi cricket player
Lata Narvekar, (born 1940), Indian producer and stage actress.
Lata Pada (born 1947), Canadian choreographer and dancer.
Lata Sabharwal (born 1975), Indian actress and model.

See also
 Lata (disambiguation)

Hindu given names
Indian feminine given names